Benoit Groulx (born January 30, 1968) is a Canadian former professional ice hockey player. He is currently the head coach of the Syracuse Crunch of the AHL and formerly the head coach and general manager for the Gatineau Olympiques of the  QMJHL.

Playing career
Groulx played major junior hockey with the Granby Bisons  of the QMJHL.

Coaching career
In 2000, following an 11-year professional career played mostly in France, Groulx turned to coaching, taking an assistant position with the Shawinigan Cataractes of the QMJHL. He became a head coach during the 2000–01 QMJHL season when he replaced John Chabot to take the reins of the Hull Olympiques, which was changed to the Gatineau Olympiques in 2003 following the city's amalgamation in 2002, where he won the 2003–04 Ron Lapointe Trophy  as the QMJHL coach of the year. He was a  head coach in the American Hockey League with the Rochester Americans for both the 2008–09 and 2009–10 AHL seasons, but re-join the Gatineau Olympiques in 2010.

After serving as assistant coach under Brent Sutter at the 2014 World Junior Championships, he was named head coach for Team Canada for the 2015 World Junior Championships.

Groulx was named head coach of the Syracuse Crunch on May 10, 2016, replacing Rob Zettler. In his first season as head coach, he led the Crunch to the Calder Cup Finals and an Eastern Conference title. His second season as head coach of the Crunch was also success. His Crunch had a 10-game winning streak and a 7-game win streak at certain points, in which the 10-game win streak lasted from November 22, 2017 to December 15, 2017. The 7-game win streak lasted from March 14, 2018 to March 30, 2018. He also led the Crunch to their highest win percentage in franchise history, a .658 win percentage. The Crunch easily did away with Rochester in the first round sweeping the Americans, 3–0. However, the Crunch were swept by the eventual Calder Cup Champions, the Toronto Marlies, 4–0, in the second round. In the following season, the Crunch had their best regular season in their history, but were upset in round 1 by the Cleveland Monsters.

Groulx achieved 200 professional coaching wins on March 30, 2019 while coaching the Syracuse Crunch. The Crunch beat the Utica Comets 6–2.

Groulx is the winningest coach in Syracuse Crunch history, with 221 career coaching wins with the Crunch. 

During the 2021 Syracuse Crunch training camp, Groulx fractured his left elbow after falling down at practice.

In 2021, Groulx interviewed for the head coach position of the Arizona Coyotes, after a vacancy was left by Rick Tocchet. He would not get the job, as Arizona hired André Tourigny.

On February 21, 2022, Groulx won his 200th career game with the Crunch.

Coaching record

AHL

QMJHL

References

External links

1968 births
Living people
Brest Albatros Hockey players
Canadian ice hockey centres
Dauphins d'Épinal players
Dragons de Rouen players
Gatineau Olympiques coaches
Granby Bisons players
Hull Olympiques coaches
Ice hockey people from Gatineau
Rochester Americans coaches
Viry-Châtillon EH players
Canadian ice hockey coaches